The Puerto Rican Autonomist Party was a political party in Puerto Rico founded in 1887.  The Party was founded in Ponce, Puerto Rico, and its first chairman was Román Baldorioty de Castro. He was followed by Martin Corchado, a prominent physician from Ponce. Juan Hernández López was one of the co-authors of its program in 1897.

The Party sought to establish an independent government for Puerto Rico under the Spanish colonial system. The party advocated self-rule, but not independence from Spain.  It envisioned decentralized control by Spain, and the strongest possible local government.

To provide a voice for the Autonomist Party, Luis Muñoz Rivera, one of its founders, founded the newspaper La Democracia (The Democracy). In it, he argued for Puerto Rican independence, denounced the injustices of the Spanish regime, and lobbied for the support of one of the main political parties in Spain to fulfill the goals of the Autonomist party. 

In 1897 the Party joined with the less conservative but still monarchist Spanish Liberal Fusionist Party of Praxedes Mateo Sagasta, becoming the Liberal Fusionist Party of Puerto Rico. Some members in the Autonomist party who were opposed to any kind of alliance with Spanish political parties left to form the Pure and Orthodox Liberal Party, with Jose Celso Barbosa as its leader.

References

Defunct political parties in Puerto Rico
Political parties established in 1887